Nicholas Harman was a Member of the Parliament of Great Britain for Castle Rising in April 1640.

References

Year of birth missing
Year of death missing
English MPs 1640 (April)